Mark Wade (born 1965) is an American retired basketball player.

Mark Wade may also refer to:

Mark Wade, American space enthusiast and author who maintained Encyclopedia Astronautica
Mark Wade (ventriloquist), American ventriloquist
Mark Sweeten Wade (1858–1929), Canadian historian

See also
Wade (surname)
Wade Mark (born 1953), Trinidadian politician